Burton Stein (1926 – April 26, 1996) was an American historian, whose area of specialization was India.

Life and career
Stein was born and grew up in Chicago, Illinois and served in the Second World War, before commencing tertiary study at the now disused Navy Pier facility that in 1945 was the Chicago campus of the University of Illinois. Stein was an unusual case in that he never completed a bachelor's degree. He was admitted directly into a Master of Arts program at the University of Chicago, finishing his masters in 1954 under the supervision of Robert Crane. He wrote his Ph.D. dissertation in 1957 on the economic functions of South India's medieval Tirupati temple.

Upon the completion of his PhD, Stein was appointed to a teaching post at the University of Minnesota, where he stayed until the end of 1965. He then married the author Dorothy Stein and moved to the University of Hawaii where he stayed for 17 years until 1983. He held visiting professorships at the University of Chicago, University of Pennsylvania, University of Washington, University of California, Berkeley and the Centre for Historical Studies of Jawaharlal Nehru University. He moved to London serving as a Professorial Research Associate of the School of Oriental and African Studies at the University of London.

Stein was known for his wide-ranging participation in seminars and other South Asian scholarly work. He continued to write prolifically in his retirement and continued to spend significant amounts of time consulting with students and other scholars. He was known for his dry sense of humour and usually responded to student questioning by posing counterquestions.

Research
Stein's contributions as a research scholar was mainly focused on premodern and colonial South India. He spent the early 1960s formulating a hypothesis about the nature of "state" in South India. He was skeptical of the existence of a system of bureaucracy in the Chola Dynasty. He delved into the theory of tribal society and referred to the work of Aidan Southall, "The Illusion of Tribe". He published his first book, Peasant, State and Society in Medieval South India (1980) with the theme of segmentary lineage.

In retirement, Burt's writing productivity increased over time, with four more books written and a fifth, A History of India, published posthumously in 1998, after being left largely complete. A second, slightly revised, edition was published in 2010, with a chapter added to bring the narrative further forward.

Stein and Jan Broek, a colleague from Minnesota, first devised the idea of a historical atlas of South Asia, and enlisted the backing of Charles Leslie Ames to establish a fellowship in historical cartography of the Indian subcontinent. Under the leadership of Joseph E. Schwartzberg, the work on the atlas began in the mid-1960s. Stein was an active advisor on the project, which resulted in the publications of A Historical Atlas of South Asia, published by the University of Chicago Press in 1978.

Works
 Books
 1980: 
 1989: 
 1989: 
 1998: ; 2010: Second edition revised by David Arnold, 
 Selected articles
 1985: 
 1985:

References

Further reading
 

1996 deaths
1926 births
Writers from Chicago
American Indologists
University of Hawaiʻi faculty
Academics of SOAS University of London
University of Illinois Chicago alumni
University of Chicago alumni
University of Minnesota alumni
American historians